OUFK Kharkiv was an ice hockey team of the Kharkiv Regional College of Physical Culture and Sports in Kharkiv, Ukraine. OUFK abbreviation stands for the Regional College of Physical Culture.

The team participated in the Ukrainian Hockey Championship during the 1992-93 season. They finished in sixth and last place in the first round with a record of one win and four losses, with 12 goals for and 38 against. OUFK failed to qualify for the final round of the championship.

References

Ice hockey teams in Ukraine
College sports teams in Ukraine
Sport in Kharkiv